The 2018 Greater Sudbury municipal election was held on October 22, 2018 to elect a mayor and 12 city councillors in Greater Sudbury, Ontario. In addition, school trustees were elected to the Rainbow District School Board, Sudbury Catholic District School Board, Conseil scolaire de district du Grand Nord de l'Ontario and Conseil scolaire de district catholique du Nouvel-Ontario.

The election was held in conjunction with those held in other municipalities in the province of Ontario. For other elections, see 2018 Ontario municipal elections. For the first time in the city's history, the election was conducted primarily through online voting, with only a small number of physical voting locations available for people who could not or did not want to vote online.

As per the Ontario Municipal Elections Act, 1996, nomination papers for candidates for municipal and school board elections can be filed from May 1, 2018, at which time the campaign period began.

Issues
The dominant issue in the election campaign was the Kingsway Entertainment District, a proposed new arena and hotel complex in the city's east end which will replace the Sudbury Arena as the city's primary sports and entertainment events venue.

In the end, the newly elected council comprises a mix of both supporters and opponents of the Entertainment District.

Voting delays
On election day, Greater Sudbury was one of 51 municipalities across Ontario whose elections were affected by a technical failure at Dominion Voting Systems, the company that operated the online voting architecture. According to Dominion Voting Systems, the company's colocation centre provider imposed an unauthorized bandwidth cap due to the massive increase in voting traffic in the early evening, thus making it impossible for many voters to get through to the server. Under the provisions of the Ontario Municipal Act which permit city clerks to extend voting hours in the event of an emergency, the city announced that voting would be extended to October 23, with no results announced until Tuesday evening.

Mayor

City Council

Ward 1

Ward 2

Ward 3

Ward 4

Ward 5

Ward 6

Ward 7

Ward 8

Ward 9

Ward 10

Ward 11

Ward 12

Leo Frappier stepped down 2 months prior to the election due to a conflict with the city of Greater Sudbury, however the election officials allowed his name to remain on the electronic ballots.

References

External links
City of Greater Sudbury Municipal Elections 2018

2018 Ontario municipal elections
2018